Sedimental is an independent recording label based in Greenfield, Massachusetts releasing mainly experimental, sound art, noise, free jazz, avant garde and drone music. It began 20 years ago in Austin, Texas with the first album from ambient-drone group Stars of the Lid and their debut Music for Nitrous Oxide in 1995. It has followed up to present day with specialized releases from Phill Niblock, Kyle Bobby Dunn, Francisco Lopez, Brendan Murray, and Alessandro Bosetti. Most of which are limited editions of 500 copies.

The label prints and presses their vinyl and compact disc releases in house and often with a unique, non-plastic gatefold sleeve.

Related activities include radio (wzbc 90.3 fm- Boston) and Non-Event in conjunction with Dan Hirsch, Susanna Bolle and Bhob Rainey in promoting local, national and international experimental and improvising artists in live settings for the Boston area as well as Mental-Drift in coordinating very infrequent performances in the Pioneer Valley.

External links
Sedimental Discogs Page 
Official Website

Record labels established in 1993
Experimental music record labels
Electronic music record labels
American independent record labels
Alternative rock record labels